Schoenotenes is a genus of moths belonging to the subfamily Tortricinae of the family Tortricidae.

Species
Schoenotenes affinis Diakonoff, 1954
Schoenotenes agana Diakonoff, 1954
Schoenotenes aphrodes Diakonoff, 1954
Schoenotenes argentaura Diakonoff, 1960
Schoenotenes aurispersa Diakonoff, 1954
Schoenotenes capnosema Turner, 1918
Schoenotenes centroicta Diakonoff, 1960
Schoenotenes chalcitis Diakonoff, 1954
Schoenotenes coccyx Diakonoff, 1954
Schoenotenes collarigera Diakonoff, 1968
Schoenotenes croceosema Diakonoff, 1954
Schoenotenes decta Diakonoff, 1974
Schoenotenes elasma Razowski, 2013
Schoenotenes emmetra Razowski, 2013
Schoenotenes gliscens Diakonoff, 1960
Schoenotenes iners Diakonoff, 1960
Schoenotenes lichenochroma Diakonoff, 1954
Schoenotenes luminosa Diakonoff, 1960
Schoenotenes nanodes Diakonoff, 1954
Schoenotenes oenographa Diakonoff, 1954
Schoenotenes oligosema Diakonoff, 1954
Schoenotenes ovalis Diakonoff, 1973
Schoenotenes pallida Diakonoff, 1954
Schoenotenes peos Razowski, 2013
Schoenotenes peralba Diakonoff, 1960
Schoenotenes petraea Diakonoff, 1954
Schoenotenes plagiostibus Diakonoff, 1954
Schoenotenes prophanes Diakonoff, 1954
Schoenotenes pseudurga Diakonoff, 1960
Schoenotenes sciocosma Meyrick, 1938
Schoenotenes spilonoma Meyrick, 1938
Schoenotenes sufflava Diakonoff, 1954
Schoenotenes synchorda Meyrick, 1908
Schoenotenes trachygrapha Diakonoff, 1954
Schoenotenes vana Diakonoff, 1954

See also
List of Tortricidae genera

References

External links
tortricidae.com

Schoenotenini
Moth genera
Taxa named by Edward Meyrick